The N10 road is a national primary road in Ireland, connecting Kilkenny to the M9 Dublin – Waterford route. It consists of a route from northeast of Kilkenny, a ring road around the city, and a route southeast of the city.

Route

, the route leaves the M9 at junction 8, proceeding westwards to the outskirts of Kilkenny, where it meets the Kilkenny Ring Road at a roundabout. The newest section of the ring road (opened in 2008) leaves the roundabout northwards as the N77 to Durrow. The N10 continues along the ring road around the southeast side of the city. At a roundabout junction with the N76 to Clonmel it leaves the ring heading southwards through Stoneyford and Knocktopher. Just north of Ballyhale, the N10 rejoins the M9 at junction 9.

2008 Upgrade 

In 2008 construction on the M9 section between Powerscourt and Knocktopher replaced the old N9 road. The motorway links to the N10 at two locations, as the original N9 route did. However, the M9 passes further west, closer to Kilkenny, thus more than halving the length of the original N10 route.

The original N10 has been downgraded to the R712 road.

The remaining section of the original N10 has been downgraded to the R713 road.

See also
Roads in Ireland 
Motorways in Ireland
National secondary road
Regional road

References
Roads Act 1993 (Classification of National Roads) Order 2006 – Department of Transport
N9 – N10 Kilcullen to Waterford Road Scheme – Kilkenny County Council and Kildare National Roads Design Office.

10
Roads in County Kilkenny